Aulacodes methodica is a moth in the family Crambidae. It was described by Edward Meyrick in 1917. It is found in Peru.

References

Acentropinae
Moths described in 1936
Moths of South America